Seigmen (formed in 1989 in Tønsberg, Vestfold, Norway) is a Norwegian alternative rock band who came into prominence in the early 1990s. The band's name is derived from Norwegian sweets brand Laban Seigmenn. The band went from a hard-edged grunge-like style to a more dynamic sound with more ambient parts and use of synthesizers and various audio-effects.

History
The band was formed in  Tønsberg, Norway, in 1989. Økshoff and Møklebust started a band with the name Klisne Seigmenn having their first gig at the “Julerock” (“Christmas rock”) event in Tønsberg on December 27, 1989. In 1990, Christensen, Ljung and Ronthi joined the band. They recorded several studio albums, including two with American producer Sylvia Massy in Los Angeles. After a farewell tour they split, relocated to Los Angeles and formed Zeromancer in January 2000.

Seigmen reunited during the UKA-festival in Trondheim on October 20, 2005, and decided in November 2005 to do even more reunion gigs in Norway: there were seven shows in February 2006. Having great success with the reunion tour, they did six more gigs at various festivals across Norway during summer 2006, mostly as the headlining act. Media reports that summer said that Seigmen did not rule out another reunion some time in the future. In early 2008 it was announced that Seigmen would again play live, which they did on June 21 the Oslo Opera House, as one of the shows celebrating the opening of the new Opera House in Oslo. Selling out the show quickly, a second concert was set up the day after. In 2013 they  contributed to the book "Think like a rockstar" Tenk som en rockestjerne, by Ståle Økland.
Seigmen released a new album Enola in 2015.

Members
 Kim Ljung (bass guitar, vocals)
 Alex Møklebust (main vocals)
 Noralf Ronthi (percussion)
 Marius Roth Christensen (guitar, vocals)
 Sverre Økshoff (guitar)

Møklebust, Ljung and Ronthi formed the band Zeromancer in 2000. Ljung also has a solo project under the name Ljungblut.

Discography

Albums
Ameneon (1993)
Total (1994) Norway #19 
Metropolis (1995) Norway #1 
Metropolis - The Grandmaster Recordings (English language version of Metropolis) (1996) Norway #11 
Radio Waves (1997) Norway #1 
Enola (2015)

Singles/EPs
Pluto (1992)
"Monsun" (1993)
"Hjernen er alene" (1994) Norway #5 
"Döderlein" (1994) Norway #14 
"Lament" (1994)
"Metropolis" (1995) Norway #4 
"Slaver av solen" (1995) Norway #3 
"The First Wave" (1997) Norway #12 
"The Next Wave" (1997)
"The Opera For The Crying Machinery" (1997) [Rare and never released]
"Mørkets øy" (1997)
"Döderlein" (2006) (single from the live album Rockefeller)

Demos 
Det finnes alltid en utvei.... (1990) [This came in only 45 copies, cassette tapes only. Very rare.]

DVDs 
Rockefeller (live reunion album) (2006) Norway #8 
Fra X til døden (2006) [Concert DVD recorded at UKA-05, in Dødens dal, Trondheim]
Seigmen - Seigmen I Operaen 2008 (2012) [Concert DVD *LTD - Signed by the band - Only a limited number of copies]

Compilations
Monument (1999) Norway #11

References

External links
 Seigmen.com. Official homepage. Accessed April 30, 2015
 Korsfarer. The biggest fan site. Accessed April 30, 2015
 Seigmen.org. Seigmen newsfeed. Accessed April 30, 2015

Spellemannprisen winners
Norwegian hard rock musical groups
Norwegian rock music groups
Musical groups established in 1989
1989 establishments in Norway
Musical groups from Tønsberg